"Eighteen Strings" is a song by English techno producer Tinman. It was reached number nine in the United Kingdom and peaked atop the UK Dance Chart. Outside the UK, "Eighteen Strings" topped the Canadian RPM Dance/Urban chart and reached the top 20 in Australia, Finland, Ireland and Italy.

Critical reception
Music writer and columnist James Masterton described it as a "mainly instrumental track", "using a guitar figure that is startlingly similar to Smells Like Teen Spirit. Closer examination reveals it is actually a slightly different sequence of chords, but not enough to dull recognition." Pan-European magazine Music & Media commented, "The strings attached to this dance bopper are direct quotes from Nirvana's Smells Like Teen Spirit. Sequencers and the "rock da house down" one-line chorus finish it off."

Track listings
 CD single - Netherlands
 "Eighteen Strings" (Radio Edit) - 3:48	
 "Free" (Freedom To Party Edit) - 5:07

 CD maxi - Netherlands
 "Eighteen Strings" (Radio Edit) - 3:48	
 "Eighteen Strings" (Full On Kitchen Mix) - 7:10	
 "Eighteen Strings" (Chris & James Remix) - 7:24	
 "Free" (Freedom To Party Mix) - 5:07

Charts

Weekly charts

Year-end charts

References

1993 songs
1994 singles
Music Week number-one dance singles
Polydor Records singles
Songs written by Bobby Hart
Songs written by Tommy Boyce
Tinman songs